The Nijmegen train disaster was a railway accident in the Netherlands in which two passenger trains—of which one did not contain passengers—collided head-on. The accident happened on 28 August 1979 between Wijchen and Nijmegen, near the Kolpingbuurt neighbourhood in Nijmegen on the railway line Tilburg to Nijmegen. Eight people died in the disaster, seven passengers and the driver of train 4365. 36 people were injured, including the conductor and driver of train 74363.

Trains
Two trains were involved in the accident. The first was an empty train 74363 destined for Nijmegen railway station. This train consisted of a multiple unit of the Mat '64 Plan V 936 type. The second was train 4365 consisting of two two-carriage multiple units of the Mat '46 type, units 256 and 244. Train 74363 traveled at about 5 km/h, the passenger train 4365 at about 90 km/h.

See also

 List of rail accidents (1970–1979)

References

Further reading
  Spoorwegongevallen in Nederland, 1839-1993; writer: R.T. Jongerius, Published by: Schuyt & Co, 1993. Part 22 in the book range of the Nederlandse Vereniging van Belangstellenden in het Spoor- en tramwegwezen (NVBS), .

External links
 

Train collisions in the Netherlands
Railway accidents in 1979
1979 in the Netherlands
Accidents and incidents involving Nederlandse Spoorwegen
August 1979 events in Europe
1979 disasters in the Netherlands